The 1892 Washington gubernatorial election was held on November 8, 1892.

Republican nominee John McGraw defeated Democratic nominee Henry J. Snively and Populist nominee Cyrus W. Young, with 37.01% of the vote.

General election

Candidates
Major party candidates
John McGraw, Republican, King County Sheriff
Henry J. Snively, Democratic

Other candidates
Cyrus W. Young, Populist
Roger Sherman Greene, Prohibition

Results

References

1892
Washington
Gubernatorial